Fruitcakes is the eighteenth studio album by American singer-songwriter Jimmy Buffett.  Initially to be called Quietly Making Noise, the album was released in May 1994, and was Buffett's first studio recording since Off to See the Lizard (1989). Buffett had used the five-year hiatus to focus on writing books such as Tales from Margaritaville (1989) and Where Is Joe Merchant? (1992).

Chart performance
Fruitcakes reached #5 on the Billboard 200 album chart making it Buffett's first top ten album.  The album was also certified "Platinum" by the RIAA on December 19, 2004.

The first single from the album, "Fruitcakes," charted at No. 29 on the Billboard Adult Contemporary chart.  The second single, "Frenchman for the Night," did not chart.

Songs
Several of the songs on this album are covers of other recording artists.  The first of these is Grateful Dead's "Uncle John's Band".  "Sunny Afternoon" is a song by The Kinks.  "She's Got You" is a famous Country/Pop song written by Hank Cochran and first recorded and released as a single by Patsy Cline.

Track listing

Personnel
The Coral Reefer Band:
Jimmy Buffett – guitar, vocals
Michael Utley – keyboards
Greg "Fingers" Taylor – harmonica
Robert Greenidge – steel drums, percussion
Roger Guth – drums
Peter Mayer – guitars, vocals
Jim Mayer – bass, vocals
Amy Lee – saxophone
Johnny Padilla – saxophone
John Lovell – trumpet
Angel Quinones – congas, percussion
Michael Tschudin – keyboards, mallet kat
Nicky Yarling – violin, vocals
Mac McAnally – guitar, vocals
G.E. Smith – guitar
Claudia Cummings, Mary Harris, Nicolette Larson – background singers

Notes

Jimmy Buffett albums
1994 albums
MCA Records albums